John Frederick Kiley (July 1, 1859 – December 18, 1940) was a Major League Baseball outfielder and pitcher, born in Dedham, Massachusetts, who played parts of two seasons in the majors. In , he played 14 games in the outfield for the Washington Nationals of the American Association. He did not appear again in the majors until , when he started one game on May 7 for the Boston Beaneaters, which he lost.  He died in Norwood, Massachusetts.

Sources

1859 births
1940 deaths
Sportspeople from Dedham, Massachusetts
Baseball players from Massachusetts
Major League Baseball left fielders
19th-century baseball players
Washington Nationals (AA) players
Boston Beaneaters players
Willimantic (minor league baseball) players
Lawrence (minor league baseball) players
Brockton (minor league baseball) players
Boston Blues players
Salem (minor league baseball) players
Salem Witches players
Lewiston (minor league baseball) players